André Swytka Ghem (born 29 May 1982) is a Brazilian professional tennis player. He reached his highest ATP singles ranking in July 2015, when he became the World No. 118.

Career 
Born  in Porto Alegre, Brazil, Ghem became the World No. 181 in August 2006. At the 2006 Brasil Open, he won against Gustavo Kuerten. The score was 3–6, 6–3, 6–4.

Titles (14)

Challengers and futures (5)

Doubles (9)

Runners-up (7)

Singles (1)

Doubles (6)

References

External links 
 

1982 births
Living people
Brazilian male tennis players
Brazilian people of German descent
Brazilian people of Polish descent
People from Novo Hamburgo
Sportspeople from Rio Grande do Sul